Majid Rezaei is a retired Iranian goalkeeper who played for Iran national football team in 1986 Asian Games. He was formerly playing for Esteghlal Tehran and Iran national football team.

References

External links
 
 Majeed Rezaei at TeamMelli.com

Iran international footballers
Iranian footballers
Esteghlal F.C. players
Living people
Footballers at the 1986 Asian Games
Association football goalkeepers
Year of birth missing (living people)
Asian Games competitors for Iran